Grateful Dead Origins is a graphic novel about the rock band the Grateful Dead.  A work of non-fiction, it tells the story of the early days of the band and how it emerged as part of the San Francisco music scene amid the counterculture of the 1960s.  The book was written by Chris Miskiewicz and drawn by Noah Van Sciver.  It was edited by David Lemieux, colored by Aladdin Collar, and designed by Tyler Boss.

Grateful Dead Origins was published by Z2 Comics in July 2020.  A deluxe edition of the book was published in January 2021.

Deluxe edition 
The deluxe edition of Grateful Dead Origins is larger in size than the regular edition and has a hard cover.  It includes an LP record of the Grateful Dead performing at the Fillmore West in San Francisco on August 21, 1968.  The deluxe version is a limited edition of 6,800 copies.  The LP was also offered for sale as a separate item, without the book.

Critical reception 
In AIPT, Christopher Franey wrote, "Noah Van Sciver has a style that is caricatured but not way off base. His layouts are great, as they flow nicely and have an interesting vibe to them – they move along in a structure, but when the musical scenes happen, the panels get bigger and livelier.  I really appreciate Aladdin Collar working on the colors as it helps to evoke that free spirit, counter-culture feel that these guys embodied.... Chris Miskiewicz does a great job telling a story that makes us feel like we are there.... This is a great graphic novel musical mash-up that does more than any Wikipedia page can do."

In The Comics Journal, Tegan O'Neil wrote, "Coming to the book from the perspective of someone with, if we're being blunt, pretty much zero desire to ever again have to think about the Grateful Dead, it was a very pleasantly readable narrative.... [Noah Van Sciver's] pen is extraordinarily expressive.... Written by Chris Miskiewicz, the book flows pretty well considering how choppy these kind of biopic projects can read in comics form.... The book will find a happy home on many fans' shelves.... It doesn't work completely as a comic book because it's not supposed to be encountered in a vacuum apart from the music."

Album 

As noted above, the deluxe edition of the Grateful Dead Origins book includes an LP record of the same name.  The album was also sold separately, without the book.  It was recorded live in concert at the Fillmore West in San Francisco on August 21, 1968.

Track listing 
Side 1:
 "Dark Star" (Jerry Garcia, Mickey Hart, Bill Kreutzmann, Phil Lesh, Ron McKernan, Bob Weir, Robert Hunter) – 14:33
 "St. Stephen" (Garcia, Lesh, Hunter)  – 4:45
Side 2:
 "The Eleven" (Lesh, Hunter) – 11:07
 "Death Don't Have No Mercy" (Reverend Gary Davis) – 8:09

Personnel 
Grateful Dead
Jerry Garcia – guitar, vocals
Mickey Hart – drums
Bill Kreutzmann – drums
Phil Lesh – bass, vocals
Ron McKernan – keyboards
Bob Weir – guitar, vocals
Production
Produced by Grateful Dead
Produced for release by David Lemieux
Mastering: David Glasser
Recording: Dan Healey
Cover art: Noah Van Sciver
Art direction, design: Steve Vance

References 

Grateful Dead
Books about rock music
2020 non-fiction books
2020 graphic novels